Jan Jodilyn Fronda is a Filipina chess player who twice won the Philippine Chess Championship.

Fronda is from Alaminos, Pangansinan.

As a junior in 2013, she won the girls' national championship and in September, 2013, she finished 28th in the girls' division in the World Junior Chess Championship in Turkey.

Fronda earned the title of Woman international master (WIM) in 2014.

Fronda is a De La Salle University alumnus, and during her years at the school she won awards as Rookie of the Year, Athlete of the Year, and was a three-time UAAP MVP award winner as she led the university's women's chess team to win the UAAP championship four consecutive times. While still a student at De La Salle, she won her first national championship in 2015. 

While completing in the 2016 Chess Olympiad, Fronda's endgame win against GM Bela Khotenashvili was pivotal to the Filipina team's upset of Georgia in the second round.

Fronda, after teaching chess in Singapore at the Asean Chess Academy for two years, again won the women's national chess championship of the Philippines in 2019. The only undefeated player in the round-robin event, she finished with six wins and seven draws, a full point ahead of her nearest competition. The Philippine News Agency called her 41-move win in a King's Indian Defense against WFM Allaney Jia Doroy a "brilliant final-round victory" although The Rappler quoted Fronda as saying, "I was lucky. Doroy appeared to have the advantage because her pieces were active but she did not assess the position accurately. That is why I got the advantage." 

In August, 2022, Fronda played second board for the Philippine women's Chess Olympiad team.

Known as "Coach Jodi" by her students at the Asean Chess Academy, Fronda is a licensed FIDE instructor for 2022-2023.

References

External links 

 
 Player profile at Chess.com

Filipino female chess players
1994 births
Living people
Chess Woman International Masters